Galecyon ("polecat-dog") is a genus of hyaenodonts that lived during the early Eocene in Europe and North America (found in the Clarks Fork and Powder River basins of Wyoming).

Description
Galecyon had robust canines and short, deep jaws. Prior to 2015, little was known about its post-cranial skeleton.

Phylogeny
The phylogenetic relationships of genus Galecyon are shown in the following cladogram.

See also
 Mammal classification
 Hyaenodonta

References

Hyaenodonts
Eocene mammals
Prehistoric mammals of North America
Prehistoric mammals of Europe
Eocene genus first appearances
Prehistoric placental genera